Visitors to Botswana require a visa unless they come from one of the visa exempt countries.

Visa policy map

Visa exemption 

Holders of passports of the following 103 jurisdictions do not require a visa to visit Botswana for up to 90 days (within a 12-month period):

All visitors must hold a passport valid for 6 months.

Holders of diplomatic or service passports of China and diplomatic passport of India do not require a visa to enter Botswana.

Visa on arrival
Nationals of  can obtain visa on arrival valid for 14 days since 2019.

On 15 November 2018, the Government of Botswana announced that tourists would be able to obtain visas on arrival from 24 November 2018. The plan was put on hold on 27 November 2018. Visa on arrival for Indians was made official in 2019.</ref>

E-visa
On 12 August 2021, Botswana launched electronic visa system, all countries that needed prior visa, are now eligible for e-visa.

Ministry of foreign affairs of Botswana stated that they introduced e-visa system to boost tourism and business in country.

Visitor statistics
Most visitors arriving to Botswana were from the following countries of nationality:

See also

 Visa requirements for Botswana citizens

References

Botswana
Foreign relations of Botswana